Chang Chin-lan (1917–1975) was the first female judge in the Republic of China, as well as the first female justice on the Supreme Court of the Republic of China. She became the first female to serve as the Judge of the Judicial Yuan (Constitutional Court) of the Republic of China (Taiwan) in 1970.

See also
List of first women lawyers and judges in Asia

References

1917 births
1975 deaths
Chinese women judges
Taiwanese people from Shandong
Taiwanese women judges
Northwest University (China) alumni
Deaths from cancer in Taiwan